Thomas Wright (18 December 1924 – 2 May 1990) was a Scottish rugby union and rugby league footballer.

Rugby union
Wright was born in Hawick. He also played for Hawick RFC.

Rugby league
Wright transferred to Leeds in 1948–1949.

He later played for the Scotland national rugby league team.

References

Footnotes

External links
Statistics at espnscrum.com

1924 births
1990 deaths
Dual-code rugby internationals
Hawick RFC players
Leeds Rhinos players
Rugby league players from Hawick
Rugby union players from Hawick
Scotland international rugby union players
Scotland national rugby league team players
Scottish rugby league players
Scottish rugby union players